Events from the year 1714 in France

Incumbents
 Monarch – Louis XIV

Events
 7 March – The Treaty of Rastatt, between France and Austria
 7 September – The Treaty of Baden between France and the Holy Roman Empire

Births

 22 February –  Louis-Georges de Bréquigny, historian (died 1795).
 6 March – Jean-Baptiste Marie Pierre, painter (died 1789)
 19 March – Aymar Joseph de Roquefeuil et du Bousquet, naval officer (died 1782)
 17 June – César-François Cassini de Thury, astronomer and cartographer (died 1784)
 16 July – Marc René, marquis de Montalembert, military engineer (died 1800)
 14 August – Claude Joseph Vernet, painter (died 1789)
 27 November – Jean Philippe Goujon de Grondel, General (died 1807)

Deaths
 15 April – Jean-François de Chamillart, clergyman (born 1657)
 28 April – Jean-Jacques Clérion, sculptor (born 1637)
 11 May – Pierre Le Gros the Elder, sculptor (born 1629)
 20 June – Marie Anne Mancini, duchesse de Bouillon (born 1649)
 21 June – Paul du Ry, architect (born 1640)
 17 August – Jules de Clérambault, ecclesiastic (born c.1660)
 10 October – Pierre Le Pesant, sieur de Boisguilbert, lawmaker and Jansenist (born 1646)
 11 October – Jacques de Tourreil, jurist, orator, translator and man of letters (born 1656)
 25 October – Sébastien Leclerc, artist (born 1637)
 13 November – Guillaume-Gabriel Nivers, organist and composer (born c.1632)
 18 December – César d'Estrées, diplomat and Cardinal (born 1628)
 30 December – François Adhémar de Monteil, Comte de Grignan, aristocrat (born 1632)

Full date missing 
 Philippe Grandjean, engraver (born 1666)
 Noel Aubert de Versé, advocate of religious toleration (born c.1642/5)

See also

References

1710s in France